Brigadier Henry Archdale Tomkinson  (1881 – 21 January 1937) was a British Army officer and polo champion. He was captain of the team that won the 1914 and 1921 International Polo Cup. In 1927 he was the team manager for the International Polo Cup game.

Tomkinson was commissioned a second lieutenant in the 1st (Royal) Dragoons on 8 January 1901, and promoted to lieutenant on 27 June 1901. He served with his regiment in South Africa during the Second Boer War.

He died on 21 January 1937.

References

External links

1881 births
1937 deaths
1st The Royal Dragoons officers
British Army brigadiers
British Army personnel of the Second Boer War
British Army personnel of World War I
Companions of the Distinguished Service Order
English polo players
Graduates of the Royal Military College, Sandhurst
International Polo Cup
People educated at Eton College